AC-90179 is a piperidine derivative which acts as an inverse agonist at the 5-HT2A serotonin receptor and an antagonist at 5-HT2C. It was developed as a potential antipsychotic but was not pursued for medical applications due to poor oral bioavailability, however it continues to be used as a tool compound in pharmacological research.

See also 
 Pimavanserin
 Volinanserin

References 

Piperidines